Shaolin Monastery ( Shàolínsì), also known as Shaolin Temple, is a renowned monastic institution recognized as the birthplace of Chan Buddhism and the cradle of Shaolin Kung Fu. It is located at the foot of Wuru Peak of the Songshan mountain range in Dengfeng County, Henan Province, China. The  name reflects its location in the ancient grove ( lín) of Mount Shaoshi, in the hinterland of the Songshan mountains. Mount Song occupied a prominent position among Chinese sacred mountains as early as the 1st century BC, when it was proclaimed one of the Five Holy Peaks ( wǔyuè).

As the first Shaolin abbot, Batuo devoted himself to translating Buddhist scriptures and to preaching doctrines to hundreds of his followers. According to legend, Bodhidharma, the 28th patriarch of Mahayana Buddhism in India, arrived at the Shaolin Temple in 527. He spent nine years meditating in a cave of the Wuru Peak and initiated the Chinese Chan tradition at the Shaolin Temple. Thereafter, Bodhidharma was honored as the first patriarch of Chan Buddhism.

The Temple's historical architectural complex, standing out for its great aesthetic value and its profound cultural connotations, has been inscribed in the UNESCO World Heritage List. Apart from its contribution to the development of Chinese Buddhism, as well as for its historical, cultural, and artistic heritage, the temple is famous for its martial arts tradition.  Shaolin monks have been devoted to research, creation, and continuous development and perfecting of Shaolin kung fu.

The main pillars of Shaolin culture are Chan Buddhism ( Chán), martial arts ( wǔ), Buddhist art ( yì), and traditional Chinese medicine ( yī). This cultural heritage, still constituting the daily temple life, is representative of Chinese civilization. A large number of celebrities, political figures, eminent monks, Buddhist disciples, and many other people, come to the temple to visit, make pilgrimages, and hold cultural exchanges. In addition, owing to the work of official Shaolin overseas cultural centers and foreign disciples, Shaolin culture has spread around the world as a distinctive symbol of Chinese culture and a means of foreign cultural exchange.

History

Northern Wei and Northern Zhou dynasties
Batuo, also referred to in the Chinese sources as Fotuo and in Sanskrit as Buddhabhadra, had enjoyed the sponsorship of the Emperor Xiaowen of Northern Wei since arriving in Pingcheng via the Silk Road, around the year 490. Yang Xuanzhi, in the Record of the Buddhist Monasteries of Luoyang (AD 547), and Li Xian, in the Ming Yitongzhi (1461), concur with Daoxuan's location and attribution. The Jiaqing Chongxiu Yitongzhi (1843) specifies that this monastery, located in the province of Henan, was built in the twentieth year of the Taihe era of the Northern Wei dynasty, that is, the monastery was built in AD 495.

Thanks to Batuo, Shaolin became an important center for the study and translation of original Buddhist scriptures. It also became a place of gathering for esteemed Buddhist masters. Historical sources on the early origins of Shaolin kung fu show that at this time, martial arts practice was existent in the temple. Batuo's teaching was continued by his two disciples, Sengchou ( Sēngchóu, 480–560) and Huiguang ( Huìguāng, 487–536).

In the first year of the Yongping era (506), Indian monks Lenamoti (in Sanskrit: Ratnamati) and Putiliuzhi (in Sanskrit: Bodhiruci) came to Shaolin to set up a scripture translation hall. Together with Huiguang, they translated master Shiqin's ( Shìqīn; in Sanskrit: Vasubandhu) commentary on the Ten Stages Sutra (Sanskrit: Daśabhūmika Sūtra;), an early, influential Mahayana Buddhist scripture. After that, Huiguang promoted the Vinaya in Four Parts ( Sì fēn lǜ; Sanskrit: Dharmagupta-Vinaya), which formed the theoretical basis of the Luzong (律宗 Lǜzōng) School of Buddhism, formed during the Tang Dynasty by Dao Xuan (596–667).

In the third year of the Xiaochang era (527) of Emperor Xiaoming of Northern Wei, Bodhidharma ( Dá mó), the 28th patriarch of Mahayana Buddhism in India, came to the Shaolin Temple. The Indian arrived as a Chan Buddhist missionary and traveled for decades throughout China before, settling on Mount Song in the 520s. Bodhidharma's teachings were primarily based on Lankavatara Sutra, which contains the conversation between Gautama Buddha and Bodhisattva Mahamatti, who is considered the first patriarch of Chan tradition.

Using the teachings of Batuo and his disciples as a foundation, Bodhidharma introduced Chan Buddhism, and the Shaolin Temple community gradually grew to become the center of Chinese Chan Buddhism. Bodhidharma's teaching was transmitted to his disciple Huike, who the legend says cut off his arm to show his determination and devotion to the teachings of his master. Huike was forced to leave the temple during the persecution of Buddhism and Daoism (574–580) by Emperor Wu of Northern Zhou. In 580, Emperor Jing of Northern Zhou restored the temple and renamed it Zhi‘ao Temple (陟岵寺 Zhìhù sì).

The idea that Bodhidharma founded martial arts at the Shaolin Temple was spread in the 20th century. However, martial arts historians have shown this legend stems from a 17th-century qigong manual known as the Yijin Jing. The oldest available copy was published in 1827. The composition of the text itself has been dated to 1624. Even then, the association of Bodhidharma with martial arts only became widespread as a result of the 1904–1907 serialization of the novel The Travels of Lao Ts'an in Illustrated Fiction Magazine:

Other scholars see an earlier connection between Da Mo and the Shaolin Monastery. The monk and his disciples are said to have lived at a spot about a mile from the Shaolin Temple that is now a small nunnery.
In the 6th century, around AD 547, The Record of the Buddhist Monasteries says Da Mo visited the area near Mount Song. In AD 645, The Continuation of the Biographies of Eminent Monks describes him as being active in the Mount Song region. Around AD 710, Da Mo is identified specifically with the Shaolin Temple (Precious Record of Dharma's Transmission or Chuanfa Baoji) and writes of his sitting facing a wall in meditation for many years. It also speaks of Huike's many trials in his efforts to receive instruction from Da Mo. In the 11th century (1004), a work embellishes the Da Mo legends with great detail. A stele inscription at the Shaolin Monastery dated to 728 Ad reveals Da Mo residing on Mount Song. Another stele from AD 798 speaks of Huike seeking instruction from Da Mo. Another engraving dated to 1209 depicts the barefoot saint holding a shoe, according to the ancient legend of Da Mo. A plethora of 13th- and 14th-century steles feature Da Mo in various roles. One 13th-century image shows him riding a fragile stalk across the Yangtze River. In 1125, a special temple was constructed in his honor at the Shaolin Monastery.

Sui, Tang, Wu Zhou, and Song dynasties
Emperor Wen of Sui, who was a Buddhist himself, returned the temple's original name and offered to its community 100 hectares of land. Shaolin thus became a large temple with hundreds of hectares of fertile land and large properties. It was once again the center of Chan Buddhism, with eminent monks from all over China visiting on a regular basis.

At the end of the Sui dynasty, the Shaolin Temple, with its huge monastery properties, became the target of thieves and bandits. The monks organized forces within their community to protect the temple and fight against the intruders. At the beginning of the Tang dynasty, thirteen Shaolin monks helped Li Shimin, the future second emperor of the Tang dynasty, in his fight against Wang Shichong. They captured Shichong's nephew Wang Renze, whose army was stationed in the Cypress Valley. In 626, Li Shimin, later known as Emperor Taizong, sent an official letter of gratitude to the Shaolin community for the help they provided in his fight against Shichong and thus the establishment of the Tang Dynasty. According to legend, Emperor Taizong granted the Shaolin Temple extra land and a special "imperial dispensation" to consume meat and alcohol during reign of the Tang dynasty. If true, this would have made Shaolin the only temple in China that did not prohibit alcohol. Regardless of historical veracity, these rituals are not practiced today. This legend is not corroborated in any period documents, such as the Shaolin Stele, erected in AD 728. The stele does not list any such imperial dispensation as reward for the monks' assistance during the campaign against Wang Shichong; only land and a water mill are granted. The Tang dynasty also established several Shaolin branch monasteries throughout the country and formulated policies for Shaolin monks and soldiers to assist local governments and regular military troops. Shaolin Temple also became a place where emperors and high officials would come for temporary reclusion. Emperor Gaozong of Tang and Empress Wu Zetian often visited the Shaolin Temple for good luck and made large donations. Empress Wu also paid several visits to the Shaolin Temple to discuss Chan philosophy with high monk Tan Zong. During the Tang and Song dynasties, the Shaolin Temple was extremely prosperous. It had more than 14,000 acres of land, 540 acres of temple grounds, more than 5,000 rooms, and more than 2,000 monks. The Chan Buddhist School founded by Bodhidharma flourished during the Tang dynasty and was the largest Buddhist school of that time.

Information about the first century of the Northern Song dynasty is scarce. The rulers of Song supported the development of Buddhism, and Chan established itself as dominant over other Buddhist schools. Around 1093, Chan master Baoen ( Bào'ēn) promoted the Caodong School in the Shaolin Temple and achieved what is known in Buddhist history as "revolutionary turn into Chan". This meant that the Shaolin Temple officially became a Chan Buddhist Temple, while up to that point it was a Lǜzōng temple specialized in Vinaya, with a Chan Hall.

Yuan, Ming, and Qing dynasties
At the beginning of the Yuan dynasty, Emperor Shizu of Yuan installed the monk Xueting Fuyu (1203–1275) as the abbot of Shaolin and put him in charge of all the temples in the Mount Song area. During this period, the abbot undertook important construction work, including the building of the Bell Tower and the Drum Tower. He also introduced the generational lineage system of the Shaolin disciples through a 70-character poem—each character in line corresponding to the name of the next generation of disciples. In 1260, Fuyu was honored with the title of the Divine Buddhist Master and in 1312 posthumously named Duke of Jin ( Jìn guó gōng) by the Yuan emperor.

The fall of the Yuan dynasty and the establishment of the Ming dynasty brought much unrest, in which the temple community needed to defend itself from rebels and bandits. During the Red Turban Rebellion in the 14th century, bandits ransacked the monastery for its real or supposed valuables, destroying much of the temple and driving the monks away. The monastery was likely abandoned from 1351 or 1356 (the most likely dates for the attack) to at least 1359, when government troops retook Henan. The events of this period would later figure heavily in 16th-century legends of the temple's patron saint Vajrapani, with the story being changed to claim a victory for the monks, rather than a defeat.

With the establishment of the Ming dynasty by mid-14th century, Shaolin recovered, and a large part of the monastic community that fled during the Red Turban attacks returned. At the beginning of the Ming dynasty, the government did not advocate martial arts. During the reign of the Jiajing Emperor, Japanese pirates harassed China's coastal areas, and generals Yu Dayou and Qi Jiguang led their troops against the pirates. During his stay in Fujian, Qi Jiguang convened martial artists from all over China, including local Shaolin monks, to develop a set of boxing and staff fighting techniques to be used against Japanese pirates. Owing to the monks' merits in fighting against the Japanese, the government renovated the temple on a large scale, and Shaolin enjoyed certain privileges, such as food tax exemption, granted by the government. Afterward, Shaolin monks were recruited by the Ming government at least six times to participate in wars. Due to their outstanding contribution to Chinese military success, the imperial court built monuments and buildings for Shaolin Temple on numerous occasions. This also contributed to the establishment of the legitimacy of Shaolin kung fu in the national martial arts community. During the Ming Dynasty (in mid-16th century), Shaolin reached its apogee and held its position as the central place of the Caodong School of Chan Buddhism.

In 1641, rebel forces led by Li Zicheng sacked the monastery due to the monks' support of the Ming dynasty and the possible threat they posed to the rebels. This effectively destroyed the temple's fighting force. The temple fell into ruin and was home to only a few monks until the early 18th century, when the government of the Qing dynasty patronized and restored it.

During the Qing dynasty, Shaolin Temple was favored by Qing emperors. In the 43rd year of the Kangxi Emperor's reign (1704), the emperor gifted a tablet to the temple, with the characters 少林寺(Shàolín sì) engraved on it in his calligraphy (originally hung in the Heavenly King Hall and later moved by the Mountain Gate). In the 13th year of the Yongzheng Emperor's reign (1735), important reconstructions were financed by the court, including the rebuilding of the gate and the Thousand Buddha's Hall. In the 15th year of his rule (1750), the Qianlong Emperor personally visited Shaolin Temple, stayed at the abbot's room overnight, and wrote poems and tablet inscriptions.

A well-known story of the temple from this period is that it was destroyed by the Qing government for supposed anti-Qing activities. Variously said to have taken place in 1647 under the Shunzhi Emperor, in 1674, 1677, or 1714 under the Kangxi Emperor, or in 1728 or 1732 under the Yongzheng Emperor, this destruction is also supposed to have helped spread Shaolin martial arts throughout China by means of the five fugitive monks. Some accounts claim that a supposed southern Shaolin Temple was destroyed instead of, or in addition to, the temple in Henan: Ju Ke, in the Qing bai lei chao (1917), locates this temple in Fujian. These stories commonly appear in legendary or popular accounts of martial history and in wuxia fiction.

While these latter accounts are popular among martial artists and often serve as origin stories for various martial arts styles, they are viewed by scholars as fictional. The accounts are known through often inconsistent 19th-century secret society histories and popular literature, and also appear to draw on both Fujianese folklore and popular narratives, such as the classical novel Water Margin. Modern scholarly attention to the tales is mainly concerned with their role as folklore.

Republic of China

In the early days of the Republic of China, the Shaolin Temple was repeatedly hit by wars. In 1912, monk Yunsong Henglin from the Dengfeng County Monks Association was elected by the local government as the head of the Shaolin Militia (Shaolin Guarding Corps). He organized the guards and trained them in combat skills to maintain local order. In the autumn of 1920, famine and drought hit Henan province, which led to thieves surging throughout the area and endangering the local community. Henglin led the militia to fight the bandits on different occasions, thus enabling dozens of villages in the temple's surroundings to live and work in peace.

In the late 1920s, Shaolin monks became embroiled in the warlords' feuds that swept the plains of northern China. They sided with General Fan Zhongxiu (1888–1930), who had studied martial arts at Shaolin Temple as a child, against Shi Yousan (1891–1940). Fan was defeated and, in the spring of 1928, Yousan's troops entered Dengfeng and Shaolin Temple, which served as Fan Zongxiu's headquarters. On 15 March, Shi Yousan's subordinate Feng Yuxiang set fire to the monastery, destroying some of its ancient towers and halls. The flames partially damaged the "Shaolin Monastery Stele" (which recorded the politically astute choice made by other Shaolin clerics fifteen hundred years earlier), the Dharma Hall, the Heavenly King Hall, Mahavira Hall, Bell Tower, Drum Tower, Sixth Ancestor Hall, Chan Hall, and other buildings, causing the death of a number of monks. A large number of cultural relics and 5,480 volumes of Buddhist scriptures were destroyed in the fire.

Japan's activities in Manchuria in the early 1930s made the National Government very worried. The military then launched a strong patriotic movement to defend the country and resist the enemy. The Nanjing Central Martial Arts Center and Wushu Institute, together with other martial arts institutions, were established around the country as part of this movement. The government also organized martial arts events such as "Martial arts returning to Shaolin". This particular event served to encourage people to remember the importance of patriotism by celebrating the contribution of Shaolin martial arts to the country's defense from foreign invasion at numerous occasions throughout history.

People's Republic of China
Since the founding of the People's Republic of China in 1949, the state officially became atheist, with roughly half of the population identifying as nonreligious or atheist. Some state-monitored religions and practices were allowed, while others, like Tibetan Buddhism, were persecuted after the takeover of Tibet by the Chinese military, in 1959.

During the Cultural Revolution, the monks of Shaolin Temple were forced to return to secular life, Buddha statues were destroyed, and temple properties were invaded. After this period ended, Shaolin Temple was repaired and rebuilt. The buildings and other material heritage that was destroyed, including the Mahavira Hall and the stone portraying "Bodhidharma facing the wall", were reconstructed according to their originals. Others, such as the ancient martial arts training ground, the Pagoda Forest, and some stone carvings that survived, still remain in their original state. In December 1996, Chuzu Temple and Shaolin Temple Pagoda Forest (No. 4-89) were listed as national key cultural relic protection units. Shaolin Temple leadership aimed for its historical architectural complex to become a United Nations World Heritage site in order to obtain annual funding for maintenance and development from the UN. After repeated submissions, their application was finally accepted by the 34th World Heritage Committee on 1 August 2010. UNESCO reviewed and approved eight sites and eleven architectural complexes, including Shaolin's Resident Hall, Pagoda Forest, and Chuzu Temple as World Cultural Heritage.

In 1994, the temple registered its name as a trademark. In the late 2000s, Shi Yongxin began authorizing Shaolin branches outside of mainland China in what has been called a franchise scheme. The branches are run by current and former monks and allow dispersion of Shaolin culture and study of Shaolin kung fu around the world. As of January 2011, Yongxin and the temple operated over forty companies in cities across the world, including London and Berlin, which have purchased land and property.

On 22 March 2006, Russian President, Vladimir Putin, visited Shaolin Temple and watched a kung fu performance. He was the first foreign head of state to visit Shaolin Temple in its history.

In May 2007, Shaolin Temple was named a National 5A Scenic Spot by the China National Tourism Administration.

In 2009, Shaolin Temple established Fengyinghang Co., Ltd. to prepare for the construction of the first Overseas Shaolin Cultural Center Headquarters (Hong Kong Shaolin Temple) outside of mainland China.

In April 2013, the Shaolin Temple Sutra Pavilion was selected as a National Key Protection Unit for Ancient Books, as its collection of documents and books related to kung fu theory and practice is unique in China.

In 2018, for the first time in its 1,500-year history, the Shaolin Monastery raised the national flag of China as part of a "patriotism drive" under the new National Religious Affairs Administration, a part of the United Front Work Department, which "oversees propaganda efforts as well as relations with the global Chinese diaspora". Senior theology lecturer Sze Chi Chan of Hong Kong Baptist University interpreted this move as Xi Jinping making an example of the Shaolin Monastery to send a message to other temples and the Chinese Catholic Church.

Governance
The monastery was historically led by an abbot. However, Communist restrictions on religious expression and independence have changed this ancient system. The monastery is currently led by a committee composed primarily of government officials. The treasurer is appointed by the government and as such, the abbot has little control over monastery finances. The monastery splits its profits with Dengfeng: the municipality takes two thirds of the profits, and the monastery retains one third.

Acknowledgements

 In 2004, the California State House of Representatives and Senate passed two votes to officially establish 21 March as California Songshan Shaolin Temple Day.
 In 2007, the temple was proclaimed as a National 5A-level Scenic Spot, a Global Low-carbon Ecological Scenic Spot, a patriotism education base for religious circles of the People's Republic of China, and an education base for respecting and caring for the elderly of the People's Republic of China. 
 On 1 August 2010, during the UNESCO 34th World Heritage Committee, eight buildings, including Shaolin Temple, Pagoda Forest, and Chuzu Temple were listed as World Cultural Heritage sites.
 In April 2013, the Shaolin Temple Sutra Pavilion was selected as a National Key Protection Unit for Ancient Books.
 In May 2013, the State Council of the People's Republic of China listed the ancient buildings of Shaolin Temple (No. 7-1162) as the seventh batch of national key cultural relic protection units.

Shaolin culture

Heritage culture
Shaolin Temple has developed numerous complementary cultural aspects that permeate and mutually reinforce each other and are inseparable, when it comes to presenting the temple's material and intangible cultural heritage. The most prominent aspects are those of Chan ( Chán), martial arts ( wǔ), traditional medicine ( zhōngyī), and art ( yì). Shaolin culture is rooted in Mahayana Buddhism, while the practice of Chan is its nucleus and finally, the martial arts, traditional medicine, and art are its manifestations. Thanks to the efforts of the abbot Shi Yongxin, the monastic community, and the temple's disciples from all over the world, Shaolin culture continues to grow. During its historical development, Shaolin culture has also integrated the essential values of Confucianism and Taoism.

The contemporary temple establishment offers to all interested individuals and groups, regardless of cultural, social, and religious values, the chance to experience Shaolin culture through the Shaolin cultural exchange program. This program offers an introduction to Chan meditation, Shaolin kung fu, Chan medicine, calligraphy, art, archery, etc. Chan practice is supposed to help the individual in attaining calm and patience necessary for living optimistically, meaningfully, wisely, and with compassion. Ways of practicing Chan are numerous, and they range from everyday activities such as eating, drinking, walking, or sleeping, to specialized practices such as meditation, martial arts, and calligraphy.

Shaolin kung fu is manifested through a system of different skills that are based on attack and defense movements with the form (套路 tàolù) as its unit. One form is a combination of different movements. The structure of movements is founded on ancient Chinese medical knowledge, which is compatible with the laws of body movement. Within the temple, the forms are taught with a focus on integration of the principles of complementarity and opposition. This means that Shaolin kung fu integrates dynamic and static components, yin and yang, hardness and softness, etc.

The Shaolin community invests great effort in safeguarding, developing, and innovating its heritage. Following the ancient Chinese principle of harmony between heaven and humans, temple masters work on the development of the most natural body movement in order to achieve the full potential of human expression.

Shaolin has developed activities related to the international promotion of its cultural heritage. In 2012, the first international Shaolin cultural festival was organized in Germany, followed by festivals in the US and England. Official Shaolin cultural centers exist in numerous countries in Europe, the US, Canada, and Russia. Every year, the temple hosts more than thirty international events with the aim to promote cultural exchange.

International promotion of Shaolin cultural heritage

Shaolin Temple is an important religious and cultural institution, both in China and internationally. Since the founding of the People's Republic of China, and especially since the 1970s, cultural exchanges between Shaolin Temple and the rest of the world have continuously improved in terms of content, scale, frequency, and scope. The temple has been visited by European and American dancers, martial artists, NBA players, Hollywood movie stars, but also renowned monks from traditional Buddhist countries such as Myanmar, Thailand, Cambodia, Nepal, and Sri Lanka. Also, a number of political leaders, such as Swedish King Carl XVI Gustaf, British Queen Elizabeth II, Spanish King Juan Carlos I, Australia's former prime minister John Howard, South Africa former president Nelson Mandela, Russian president Vladimir Putin, former US secretary of state Henry Kissinger, and Taiwanese politician James Soong have met with the temple's abbot.

Currently, there are more than forty overseas cultural institutions established by the temple's leadership and its disciples in dozens of countries around the world. Shaolin monks come to the centers to teach Buddhist classics, martial arts, meditation, etc. Another way of promoting Shaolin's intangible cultural heritage in the world is through Shaolin Cultural Festivals, the first of which was held in North America. These festivals and similar events convey the spiritual connotation of Chinese culture and Eastern values to societies internationally.

Myths of Shaolin

Asian monks are typically portrayed in Western culture as being knowledgeable, at peace, as well as spiritual individuals. Additionally, they are depicted as wise mystics who offer spiritual advice. This stereotype's beginnings can be traced to the 19th century, when Western explorers and missionaries first started to come into contact with Buddhist monks in Asia. The monks were typically romanticized as otherworldly, enigmatic individuals who had achieved a profound spiritual perception of reality. Despite being a poor oversimplification of the variety of beliefs, practices, and experiences among Buddhist monks, the stereotype has persisted. Jane Iwamura calls this phenomenon "virtual Orientalism" and states that it "declares an independence from the real but also co-opts or colonizes the real".

Architectural complex of Shaolin Temple

Protection of the site
The original Shaolin Temple was burned to the ground in 1928 by a renegade nationalist warlord. The monks were either killed or departed. The ground lay more or less abandoned, and under Mao Zedong's Cultural Revolution, it suffered additional damage. However, in 1982 (Mao died in 1976), the Law on the Protection of Cultural Heritage of the People's Republic of China was passed. 

The Songshan Scenic Area, established that year, came to include the Shaolin Temple Scenic Spot. "Scenic areas" were created by the 1982 law as protected regions valuable to the public for their natural or cultural assets. The Songshan Scenic Area covered the mountains around Denfeng. In 1990, the Ministry of Construction and Tongji University proposed that scenic areas be divided into subregions called "Scenic Spots". When this measure was passed by the state council (central government), the "Songshan National Scenic Area" (SNSA) acquired the "Shaolin Temple Scenic Spot" (STSS), consisting of the Shaosi side of the Scenic Area. Though named after the famous monastery in the south of the spot, it also included the north, where the government established a kung fu academy, the largest in China. The scenic spot consists of the entire park.

The government promptly allocated funds for the reconstruction of the monastery as a tourist site. They were to rebuild nine halls, restore ten, and construct eight new ones. However, all documentation on the temple had been destroyed. Already familiar with the type of structure, the architects interviewed elders who had been at the monastery before 1928 for details.

The task became greater than simply restoring the monastery of 1928. That monastery was the end point of a long line of development, which included reconstruction after some twenty or more previous destructions, and variations in size from twenty monks during the Tang dynasty (619–907) to more than 1,800 monks living in 5,000 rooms during the Yuan dynasty (1271–1368). No single configuration representative of the entire span of the monastery was apparent. Multiple possibilities existed, and deliberations about what to restore were complex and prolonged. By 1998, the government of Dengfeng had reconstructed or restored fourteen architectural items, mostly buildings.

By 2010, it was obvious that management decisions were beyond merely the government. A new management was created that year to operate a joint venture between the government, a private company from Hong Kong, and the abbot of a newly constituted body of monks. They were empowered to maintain a balance between historical authenticity and tourist sustainability.

UNESCO was not far behind this change in management technique. It took an interest and was invited to participate. In 2010, several ancient sites around Dengfeng were united into a single UNESCO World Heritage Site, with eight distinct scenic spots. The Shaolin Scenic spot contained three of the WHS components, collectively called the "architectural complex". By this, the International Council on Monuments and Sites (ICOMOS) of UNESCO designated three ancient sites: the Shaolin Temple compound, assigned the name "Kernel Compound"; its cemetery, the Pagoda Forest; and its subsidiary, the Chuzu Temple.

Access to the site
The Shaolin Temple Scenic Spot is located approximately in the middle of Mount Song, an E–W trending massif on the right bank of the Yellow River. The massif is terminated by Luoyang on the west side and Zhengzhou on the east. Either city is a popular starting point for a bus or automobile tour to the site.

Mount Song is divided by an extensive valley on its south-central side, where much of Dengfeng is located. The mountains around the valley, forming an upside-down U, have been defined as the Songshan Scenic Area. The pass over the U is located directly north of the valley. On the western side is the Shaolin Scenic Spot, accessed by China National Highway 207 (G207), which winds over the pass from the direction of Luoyang and runs past the scenic spot, before descending into the valley and joining other roads leading to Zhengzou. The north entrance of the scenic spot adjoins G207.

The North Gate is an entirely new complex built to facilitate the arrival and departure of visitors along the main point of entry, Highway G207. The local highway representing G207 in this case is East Ring Road, Dengfeng.

Topography
The buildings are arranged in three lengthwise strips. It has seven main halls on the central axis and seven other halls around, with several yards around the halls. These halls are primarily museums containing Buddhist artifacts. Memorials and monuments are scattered freely around the place, as are ancient ginkgo trees.

The architecture below follows the World Heritage Site (WHS) arrangement.

Kernel compound
 Shanmen (built in 1735; the entrance tablet, written in golden characters, reads "Shaolin Temple" in black background by the Kangxi Emperor of the Qing dynasty in 1704).
 Forest of Steles
 Ciyun Hall  (built in 1686; changed in 1735; reconstructed in 1984). It includes the Corridor of Steles, which has 124 stone tablets of various dynasties, from the Northern Qi dynasty (550–570).
 West Arrival Hall a.k.a. Kung Fu Hall (built in 1984)
 Four Heavenly Kings Hall (built during the Yuan dynasty; repaired during the Ming and Qing dynasties)
 Bell tower (built in 1345; reconstructed in 1994; the bell was built in 1204.)
 Drum tower (built in 1300; reconstructed in 1996)
 Kimnara Palace Hall (reconstructed in 1982)
 Sixth Patriarch Hall
 Mahavira Hall a.k.a. Main Hall or Great Hall (built circa 1169; reconstructed in 1985).
 Dining Hall (built during the Tang dynasty; reconstructed in 1995)
 Sutra Room
 Dhyana Halls (reconstructed in 1981)
 Guest Reception Hall
 Dharma Hall (Sermon) Hall a.k.a. Scripture Room (reconstructed in 1993)
 East & West guest rooms
 Abbot's Room (built during the early Ming dynasty)
 Standing in Snow Pavilion a.k.a. Bodhidharma Bower (reconstructed in 1983)
 Manjusri Hall (reconstructed in 1983)
 Samantabhadra Hall
 White Robe (Avalokitesvara) Hall a.k.a. Kung Fu Hall (built during the Qing dynasty)
 Ksitigarbha Hall (built during the early Qing dynasty; reconstructed in 1979)
 Thousand Buddha Hall a.k.a. Vairocana Pavilion (built in 1588; repaired in 1639, 1776)
 Ordination Platform (built in 2006)
 Monks' rooms
 Shaolin Pharmacy Bureau (built in 1217; reconstructed in 2004)
 Bodhidharma Pavilion (first built during the Song dynasty)
 Bodhidharma Cave
 Shaolin Temple Wushu Guan (Martial arts hall)

Chuzu Temple

Pagoda Forest
 Forest of Pagodas Yard (built before 791). It has 240 tomb pagodas of various sizes from the Tang, Song, Jin, Yuan, Ming, and Qing dynasties (618–1911).

Gallery

See also

 Shaolin Temple UK
 Bayon- Buddhist temple depicting martial arts bas-relief
 Angkor Wat- Buddhist–Hindu temple depicting martial arts bas-relief

Notes

References

Sources
 
 
 
  Translated by Google Translate. The sources for this indexed work are stated by the author to be the area's Guidebooks.

External links

 Close-up aerial views
 Chuzu Hermitage data archive

 
497 establishments
5th-century Buddhist temples
5th-century establishments in China
Buddhist organizations based in China
Buddhist temples in Zhengzhou
Chan temples
Chinese architectural history
Chinese warriors
Major National Historical and Cultural Sites in Henan
Religious organizations established in the 5th century
World Heritage Sites in China
Dengfeng